Oleg Gennadyevich Lepik (born 1 August 1973 in Pechory) is a former Russian-born Estonian football player.

Honours
Narva Trans
Meistriliiga runner-up: 2006
Meistriliiga bronze: 2008, 2009, 2010
Estonian Cup runner-up: 2006–07

References

External links

1973 births
People from Pechory
Sportspeople from Pskov Oblast
Living people
Russian footballers
Estonian footballers
FC Chernomorets Novorossiysk players
Russian Premier League players
FC Baltika Kaliningrad players
FCI Levadia Tallinn players
Russian expatriate footballers
Expatriate footballers in Estonia
JK Narva Trans players
Association football midfielders
Meistriliiga players